2006 in Korea may refer to:
2006 in North Korea
2006 in South Korea